Paint the Night Parade was a nighttime parade at Hong Kong Disneyland, Disney California Adventure, and Disneyland. The Hong Kong version premiered on September 11, 2014, as part of the park 9th anniversary expansion. The Disneyland version debuted on May 22, 2015, as part of the park's 60th anniversary Diamond Celebration. The parade is a spiritual successor to the long-running Main Street Electrical Parade, which has appeared at numerous Disney parks (except Hong Kong Disneyland) in several different incarnations since June 17, 1972. At Disneyland Park in California, Paint the Night made its last regular performance on September 5, 2016, and returned as a seasonal offering for the 2016 holiday season. The original Main Street Electrical Parade returned to Disneyland Park on January 19, 2017 for a limited-time run.

In July 2017, it was officially announced at the D23 Expo that Paint the Night would be moving to Disney California Adventure at the Disneyland Resort starting on April 12, 2018. A new float themed around Disney•Pixar’s The Incredibles joined the parade for the grand opening of Pixar Pier on June 23 and for the release of Incredibles 2 which hit theatres on June 15.

Paint the Night made its return to the Disneyland Resort at Disney California Adventure on April 12, 2018 and ran through November 7, 2018.  Portions of the Little Mermaid unit as well as the entire Frozen unit were removed from the parade due to their height being too tall to clear the Red Car Trolley's overhead wires.

On January 25, 2020, Hong Kong Disneyland version of the parade ran their final performance due to the COVID-19 outbreak's impact on China. And it is one of the attraction which hasn’t return for a long time after reopening.

In 2022, Disney announced that the parade will return to Hong Kong Disneyland in 2023 with the Frozen Fractals float. It was going to return in December 2022 but it was pushed back to 2023.

Hong Kong Disneyland
Disney Paint the Night Parade (Jyutping: dik6 si6 nei4 gwong1 ying2 wooi6) premiered at Hong Kong Disneyland on October 1, 2014. This is the first time Walt Disney Parks and Resorts created a fully LED parade, and features seven original floats containing over 740,000 individual lights.

The Hong Kong version of the parade uses a newly arranged version of the Main Street Electrical Parade's theme song, "Baroque Hoedown," alongside a Cantonese arrangement of Owl City's "When Can I See You Again?" from Wreck-It Ralph. In the original version of the Hong Kong version of the parade, there was a show stop in which the performers were able to interact with the interactive LED Paintbrushes sold to audience members. The show stop used an original song in Cantonese and English called "Paint the Night". The show stop was discontinued in November 2015.

The interactive "Mickey Mouse Paintbrushes," which guests can purchase in the park, allow them to interact with the performers by changing the colors of their costumes when the brushes are activated. Wearable merchandise items include the "Mickey Glow Mitt" and "Minnie Glow Bow," which change colors throughout the show through the use of RFID-enabled technology.

Units
The Hong Kong version contains the following parade units:

Current Parade Floats

 Tinker Bell and Friends (2014–present)
 Monsters, Inc. Dance Party (2014–present)
 Cars Electric Roadway Jam (2014–present)
 The Little Mermaid Electric Watercolours (2014–present)
 Belle's Candlelight Dreams (2014–present)
 Toy Story Electric Rodeo (2014–present)
 Frozen Fractals (2023–present)
 Mickey & Friends Lightastic Finale (2014–present)

Disneyland Resort (California)

The Paint the Night Parade (or Paint the Night Electrical Parade, as it is titled within the show) opened May 22, 2015, as part of Disneyland's Diamond Celebration, in commemoration of its 60th anniversary. This version of the parade utilizes over 1.5 million LED lights, special effects, and features 76 performers. The California version of the parade was inspired by the Main Street Electrical Parade. It even has a opening announcement similar to that used in the Main Street Electrical Parade. It is Disneyland's first all LED parade. The parade lasts approximately 17 minutes. During the Diamond Celebration, the entire 24-hour event was streamed live via internet by the Disneyland Resort, including the premiere of Paint the Night parade on May 22, 2015. Like the Hong Kong version, the parade jointly features arrangements of Jean-Jacques Perrey and Gershon Kingsley's "Baroque Hoedown" and Owl City's "When Can I See You Again?". This version, now in English, features new lyrics for the parade along with vocals and arrangement from Adam Young of Owl City. Following the Diamond Celebration, Paint the Night at Disneyland performed a short run during the 2016 holiday season before Disneyland revived the Main Street Electrical Parade on January 20, 2017 for a limited-time run that ended on August 20, 2017. Paint the Night officially returned to the Disneyland Resort on April 12, 2018, but this time at Disney California Adventure for Pixar Fest  which began on April 13, 2018 and ran through November 7, 2018.

Units
The Disneyland version of the parade includes 4 floats not seen in the Hong Kong version, and also moves continuously down the parade route, with no show stops.

The Disneyland version contains the following parade units:

Current Parade Floats
 Peter Pan and drum unit (featuring Rosetta, Silvermist, Iridessa, Tinkerbell, Peter Pan and Tigger from Winnie the Pooh, Genie from Aladdin and Lumière from Beauty and the Beast) (2015–present)
 Monsters, Inc. Dance Party (featuring Sulley and Mike) (2015–present)
 Cars  Electric Roadway Jam (2015–2018)
 The Incredibles Float (featuring Mr. Incredible, Elastigirl, Frozone, Dash, Violet and Jack-Jack) (2018–present)
 The Little Mermaid Electric Watercolors (featuring Ariel, Sebastian, Flounder, King Triton and Marlin and Nemo from Finding Nemo) (2015–present)
 Toy Story Electric Rodeo (featuring Woody, Buzz Lightyear and Squeeze Toy Aliens) (2015–2018)
  Candlelight Dreams (featuring Belle, Rapunzel and Cinderella) (2015–present)
 Mickey's Lightastic Finale (featuring Goofy, Donald Duck, Minnie Mouse and Mickey Mouse) (2015–present)

Retired Parade Floats
 Frozen Fractals (featuring Anna, Elsa and Olaf) (2015–2017)

References

Hong Kong Disneyland
Walt Disney Parks and Resorts parades
Disneyland
Disney California Adventure
Amusement park attractions introduced in 2018
Amusement park attractions that closed in 2018
Amusement park attractions introduced in 2022